The Swiss Telegraphic Agency (German: Schweizerische Depeschenagentur, SDA; French: Agence télégraphique suisse, ATS; Italian: Agenzia telegrafica svizzera, ATS; branded as Keystone-SDA/Keystone-ATS since 27 April 2018) is the national press agency of Switzerland, founded in 1894. In 2017, it merged with the Swiss picture agency Keystone.

The Swiss Telegraphic Agency is a non-profit organization, but is owned privately.

References

External links
 

News agencies based in Switzerland
Non-profit organisations based in Switzerland
Organizations established in 1894
1894 establishments in Switzerland
Multilingual news services
Swiss companies established in 1894